Montemaggiore may refer to several places:
Italy
Montemaggiore Belsito
Montemaggiore al Metauro
Monte Maggiore (Foggia)

France
Montemaggiore, Corsica